Arias are musical pieces for a single voice as part of a larger work.

Arias, Árias or ARIAS may also refer to:

 Arias (moth)
 Arias (surname)
 Arias, Argentina
 ARIA Music Awards (the ARIAs), annual Australian music industry awards
 Audio and Radio Industry Awards (the ARIAS), British radio and audio awards

See also
 Aria (disambiguation)
 Ariasa